The men's rings event was part of the gymnastics programme at the 1924 Summer Olympics. It was one of nine gymnastics events and it was contested for the third time after 1896 and 1904. The competition was held on Saturday, July 19, 1924. Seventy gymnasts from nine nations competed, with each nation having an 8-gymnast team (with 2 non-starters). The event was won by Francesco Martino of Italy, the nation's first medal in the event. Robert Pražák and Ladislav Vácha of Czechoslovakia earned silver and bronze, respectively.

Background

This was the third appearance of the event, which is one of the five apparatus events held every time there were apparatus events at the Summer Olympics (no apparatus events were held in 1900, 1908, 1912, or 1920). The 1922 world championship had resulted in a four-way tie among gymnasts from Czechoslovakia and Yugoslavia; Leon Štukelj was the only one of the four to compete at the 1924 Games.

The United States was the only nation that had previously competed, in 1904. The other eight nations (Czechoslovakia, Finland, France, Great Britain, Italy, Luxembourg, Switzerland, and Yugoslavia) were competing for the first time.

Competition format

Each gymnast performed a compulsory exercise and a voluntary exercise. These two exercises were 2 of the 11 components of the individual all-around score, and thus were also included in the team all-around score. Each exercise had a maximum possible score of 11, with half a point each for the approach and dismount and up to 10 points for the routine.

Schedule

Results

References

Official Olympic Report
 

Rings
Men's 1924